Marsac-en-Livradois is a commune in the Puy-de-Dôme department in Auvergne in central France.

Notable people
 

Jacques Friteyre-Durvé (1725–1792), Jesuit

See also
Communes of the Puy-de-Dôme department

References

Marsacenlivradois